Linda Lorraine "Lindy" Cochran Kelley (born July 10, 1953) is a former World Cup alpine ski racer from the United States.

Cochran is the youngest of four siblings of the "Skiing Cochrans" family of Richmond, Vermont, whose parents built and operated a ski hill in their back yard. Named to the U.S. Ski Team in 1970, Cochran competed in the 1976 Winter Olympics in Innsbruck and finished sixth in the slalom and 12th in the giant slalom. She finished 14th in slalom at the World Championships in 1974 at St. Moritz, Switzerland. Cochran competed on the World Cup circuit in the mid-1970s, then attended the University of Vermont in Burlington and raced for the Catamounts. In 1979, the Supersisters trading card set was produced and distributed; one of the cards featured Cochran's name and picture.

Cochran married Steve Kelley and all three of their children, Jessica 
 (b. 1982) Tim (b. 1986), and Robby (b. 1990), raced on the U.S. Ski Team.

World Cup results

Season standings

Points were only awarded for top ten finishes (see scoring system).

Race top tens
 1 podium (1 SL)
 7 top tens (5 SL, 2 GS)

See also
Skiing Cochrans

References

External links
 
 Lindy  Cochran World Cup standings at the International Ski Federation
 
 
 University of Vermont Athletics Hall of Fame – Lindy Cochran  – skiing – inducted 1992
 - Vermont Sports Hall of Fame Bio

1953 births
Living people
American female alpine skiers
Olympic alpine skiers of the United States
Alpine skiers at the 1976 Winter Olympics
Sportspeople from Vermont
University of Vermont alumni
Vermont Catamounts skiers
21st-century American women